The Giant's Sword is a locked room mystery short story by Joseph Commings, featuring his fictional detective Brooks U. Banner.  It was the last Banner story published in Mystery Digest.

Plot summary
The story begins in the Quartermaine Art Gallery on 57th Street, New York City.  Mrs. Estelle Whitelake buys Franz Hals' The Looten Family.  She buys the picture, and rushes it to an art expert.  The art expert first tries to explain that Franz Hals did not paint such a picture, but eventually admits it is genuine.  Estelle Whitelake pays $75,000 for the painting, and has it delivered to her apartment in Venice Court.  Whitelake regularly brags about the painting, flaunting it to her friends, writing seven page letters to her son serving in the Marines about it.  One day, she brings over several friends, including her art expert, who tells her the painting is a different one then the one he saw, and is a fake.

Senator Banner is playing pool in a dingy pool hall, when a phone call comes in.  The call is from Estelle, who begs Banner to come with her to see Mark Quartermaine, at 111 Coldrige Crescent.  Banner agrees to meet Estelle there.

Quarteriane's house is a two-story house, surrounded by trees on all sides.  Estelle leads Banner inside to meet Quartermaine's secretary Olive Culpepper, who doesn't know where Paul DeQueen (Quartermaine's agent) is, but knows where Quartermaine is.  Quartermaine is in his trophy room, a room with axes and coats of armor, and tapestries everywhere.  It has one door in, and a window on the other end of the room, that is right beside the garage.  Lying behind the oak wood desk is Quartermaine, with a huge sword driven through him, with no blood coming out of him.

Olive shrieks as Quartermaine is found, screaming they were going to be married.  Banner gets Estelle to take Olive out of the room, and then he calls the police.  DeQueen rushes into the room, through the door, and explains the sword is a Scottish claymore sword, that was supposed to hang on the wall.  The sword is to large and heavy to be lifted by any one man who was not incredibly strong, and couldn't have been driven that deep into the body, no matter how strong they are.  Banner gets every one in to rehearse their story.  Olive said she went to see Quartermaine right before Banner showed up, and heard a shoe scrape outside the window, or at least a scrape of stiff leather, but no one was looking in the window.  The sword was still on the wall.

The medical examiner looks over the body, and says the problem is, that the sword is very dull, couldn't have been driven very far, yet went through Quartermaine's ribs like a knife through butter.  With the way the sword was thrust, only a giant could have done it.  Banner gets a call from Quartermaine's lawyer Eddystone, who reveals the only people who benefited from his death are Olive, DeQueen, and Estelle.  Banner goes out, and sees the only car owned by Quartermaine is a Volkswagen.  Banner asks Olive how many miles to the gallon Quartermaine got, and she says 20.  Banner then goes to a nearby gas station, where it is revealed Quartermaine got his car filled up, and didn't drive anywhere but home, but another gallon of gas is missing.  Banner finds out that in a 20-mile radius, there is only one art gallery, Porthaven, owned by Mr. Morgan.  Morgan reveals he bought The Looten Family from Quartermaine's agent DeQueen for $75,000.

Banner gathers Estelle, and tells her there were two paintings, a real and a fake.  Estelle bought the real one, but DeQueen switched it with a fake one while delivering it to her house.  DeQueen also killed Quartermaine.  DeQueen sneaked into the trophy room, through the window, so he wouldn't be seen.  He then lured Quartermaine alone, into the garage.  While Quartermaine was there, DeQueen took the sword, tied it to the hood of the Volkswagen, and drove the spearhead through Quartermaine, as he opened the garage.  DeQueen then untied the sword, and dragged Quartermaines body into the trophy room.

1963 short stories
Works originally published in American magazines
Locked-room mysteries
Works originally published in mystery fiction magazines